Urweider is a surname. Notable people with the surname include:

Raphael Urweider (born 1974), Swiss writer and musician
Sascha Urweider (born 1980), Swiss cyclist